A boardwalk is a pedestrian walkway. It can also refer to an entertainment district on an oceanfront.

Boardwalk or The Boardwalk may refer to:


Arts and entertainment
 Boardwalk (film), a 1979 film starring Ruth Gordon, Lee Strasberg and Janet Leigh
 Boardwalk, the most expensive property in Monopoly (game)
 Boardwalk Empire, American HBO period political crime drama television series, set in Atlantic City during the 1920s

Businesses
 Boardwalk (music club), in Manchester, England
 Boardwalk (nightclub), a former nightclub and live music venue in Sheffield, Yorkshire
 Boardwalk Books, a Canadian publisher acquired by Dundurn Press
 Boardwalk Hall, an arena and U.S. National Historic Landmark in Atlantic City, New Jersey
 Boardwalk Hotel and Casino, a former establishment in Las Vegas, Nevada
 Boardwalk Pipeline Partners, an energy company based in Houston, Texas
 Boardwalk Records, a record label
 Disney's BoardWalk Resort, Walt Disney World Resort, Greater Orlando area, Florida
 Boardwalk Fun Park, an amusement park in Grand Prairie, Texas, that closed in 1992
 The Boardwalk, a themed area of Knott's Berry Farm, Buena Park, California
The Boardwalk at Coney Island, a Thor Equities proposed resort development in 2009
Coney Island Hot Dog Stand, roadside attraction formerly known as The Boardwalk at Coney Island, in Colorado
 The Boardwalk at Hersheypark, a themed area of Hersheypark in Hershey, Pennsylvania
 Santa Cruz Beach Boardwalk, an amusement park located in Santa Cruz, California

Sports
 Boardwalk Brown (1889-1977), American Major League Baseball pitcher
 Boardwalk Bowl, a post-season college football game held in Atlantic City, New Jersey

See also
Under the Boardwalk, a pop song recorded by The Drifters in 1964